Miguel Angel Hidalgo Medina was the Peruvian Minister of the Interior under President Alan García, from November 2010 to July 2011.

Biography
In 1973, he joined the Peruvian National Police, and he became an officer in 1977. In 2006, he became a General. He then became the Director of the National Police in Peru. In 2010, he was appointed as Interior Minister.

References

Living people
Government ministers of Peru
Year of birth missing (living people)